Israel competed at the 2014 Summer Youth Olympics, in Nanjing, China from 16 August to 28 August 2014.

Medalists

Archery

Israel qualified a female archer from its performance at the 2013 World Archery Youth Championships.

Individual

Team

Athletics

Israel qualified two athletes.

Qualification Legend: Q=Final A (medal); qB=Final B (non-medal);

Boys
Field Events

Gymnastics

Artistic Gymnastics

Israel qualified one athlete based on its performance at the 2014 European MAG Championships.

Boys

Rhythmic Gymnastics

Israel qualified one athlete based on its performance at the 2014 Rhythmic Gymnastics Grand Prix in Moscow.

Individual

Judo

Israel qualified one athlete based on its performance at the 2013 Cadet World Judo Championships.

Individual

Team

Sailing

Israel qualified one boat based on its performance at the 2013 World Techno 293 Championships. Later Israel qualified one more boat based on its performance at the Techno 293 European Continental Qualifiers.

Swimming

Israel qualified four swimmers.

Boys

Girls

Table Tennis

Israel qualified one athlete based on its performance at the European Qualification Event.

Singles

Team

Qualification Legend: Q=Main Bracket (medal); qB=Consolation Bracket (non-medal)

Triathlon

Israel qualified one athlete based on its performance at the 2014 European Youth Olympic Games Qualifier.

Individual

Relay

References

2014 in Israeli sport
Nations at the 2014 Summer Youth Olympics
Israel at the Youth Olympics